Ponte, a word meaning bridge in Italian, Portuguese, and Galician languages, may refer to:

Places

England
Pontefract, a town in the Metropolitan City of Wakefield

France
Ponte Leccia, a civil parish (hameau) in the department of Haute-Corse

Italy
Municipalities
Ponte (BN), in the Province of Benevento
Ponte Buggianese, in the Province of Pistoia
Ponte dell'Olio, in the Province of Piacenza
Ponte di Legno, in the Province of Brescia
Ponte di Piave, in the Province of Treviso
Ponte Gardena, Italian name for Waidbruck, in South Tyrol
Ponte in Valtellina, in the Province of Sondrio
Ponte Lambro, in the Province of Como
Ponte nelle Alpi, in the Province of Belluno
Ponte Nizza, in the Province of Provincia di Pavia
Ponte Nossa, in the Province of Bergamo
Ponte San Nicolò, in the Province of Padua
Ponte San Pietro, in the Province of Bergamo

Civil parishes and quarters
Ponte (Rome), a rione in the City of Rome
Ponte di Cerreto, in the Province of Perugia

Portugal
Ponte da Barca, a municipality in the District of Viana do Castelo
Ponte de Lima, a municipality in the District of Viana do Castelo
Ponte de Sor, a municipality in the District of Portalegre

South Africa
Ponte Tower, a landmark city apartment building in Johannesburg

Switzerland
Ponte Capriasca, a municipality in the Canton of Ticino
Ponte Tresa, a municipality in the Canton of Ticino

People
Lorenzo Da Ponte, librettist who collaborated with Mozart
Moshe Ponte (born 1956), Israeli Olympic judoka and President of the Israel Judo Association
Piero de Ponte, Italian Grandmaster of the Order of Saint John
Gabry Ponte, Italian DJ and record producer
Laura Ponte, Spanish model

Other uses
Ponte S.A, the company administering Rio-Niterói Bridge in Brazil

See also

Negroponte (disambiguation)
 Pont (disambiguation)
 Ponti (disambiguation)
 Ponto (disambiguation)
 Ponty (disambiguation)
 Ponzi